AEZ may refer to:
 Aeka language
 AEZ Zakakiou
 Agri Export Zone
 FAO Agro-Ecological Zones
AEZ Railcar - an electric multiple unit of Chilean state railways, EFE.